Nong Hi is a district (amphoe) of Roi Et province, Thailand.

Geography
Neighboring districts are (from the south clockwise): Phon Sai, Suwannaphum, and Phanom Phrai of Roi Et Province, and Sila Lat of Sisaket province.

History
The minor district (king amphoe) was created on 1 April 1995, when the three tambons Nong Hi, Sao Hae, and Duk Ueng were split off from Phanom Phrai district.

The Thai government on 15 May 2007, upgraded all 81 minor districts to full districts. With publication in the Royal Gazette on 24 August, the upgrade became official.

Administration
The district is divided into four sub-districts (tambons), which are further subdivided into 54 villages (mubans). There are no municipal (thesaban) areas. There are four tambon administrative organization (TAO).

References

External links
amphoe.com

Nong Hi